Ebbe is a Scandinavian masculine given name. The feminine version is Ebba. It is mainly now found in Denmark and Sweden and may refer to:

Ebbe Carlsson (1947–1992), Swedish journalist and publisher 
Ebbe Frick, Swedish sprint canoer 
Ebbe Gilbe (1940–2008), Swedish documentary filmmaker and director
Ebbe Grims-land (1915–2015), Swedish composer, viola and mandolin player
Ebbe Gyllenstierna (1911–2003), Swedish Army officer and modern pentathlete
Ebbe Hamerik (1898–1951), Danish composer
Ebbe Hertzberg (1847–1912), Norwegian professor, social economist and legal historian
Ebbe Hoff (1906–1985), American physiologist  
Ebbe Carsten Hornemann (1784–1851), Norwegian politician
Ebbe Kornerup (1874–1957), Danish painter and writer
Ebbe Langberg (1933–1989), Danish actor and film director
Ebbe Lieberath (1871–1937), Swedish military officer, writer and pioneer of Swedish Scouting
Ebbe Nielsen (1950–2001), Danish entomologist
Ebbe Parsner (1922–2013), Danish rower 
Ebbe Rode (1910–1998), Danish actor
Ebbe Roe Smith (born 1949), American actor and screenwriter
Ebbe Rørdam (1925–1945), member of the Danish resistance during WWII
Ebbe Sand (born 1972), Danish footballer
Ebbe Schön (born 1929), Swedish author, folklorist and associate professor in literature
Ebbe Schwartz (1901–1964), Danish football administrator
Ebbe Siönäs (born 1995), Swedish ice hockey goaltender
Ebbe Skovdahl  (1945–2020), Danish football coach and manager
Ebbe Ulfeldt (c. 1600–c. 1670), Danish landscape painter
Ebbe Wallén (1917–2009), Swedish bobsledder

Ebbe is also a surname:
 Dean Ebbe (born 1994), Irish footballer

References

Masculine given names
Scandinavian masculine given names
Danish masculine given names
Swedish masculine given names